Naima Akef (‎ ; 7 October 1929 – 23 April 1966) was a famous Egyptian belly dancer during the Egyptian cinema's golden age and starred in many films of the time. Akef was born in Tanta on the Nile Delta. Her parents were acrobats in the Akef Circus (run by her grandfather), which was one of the best known circuses at the time.  She started performing in the circus at the age of four, and quickly became one of the most popular acts with her acrobatic skills. Her family was based in the Bab el Khalq district of Cairo, but they traveled far and wide in order to perform.

Dancing
The circus disbanded when Akef was 14, but this was only the beginning of her career.  Her grandfather had many connections in the performance world of Cairo and he introduced her to his friends. When Akef's parents divorced, she formed an acrobatic and clown act that performed in many clubs throughout Cairo. She then got the chance to work in Badia Masabni's famous nightclub, where she became a star and was one of the very few who danced and sang. Her time with Badeia, however, was short-lived, as Badia favored her, which made the other performers jealous. One day they ganged up on her and attempted to beat her up, but she proved to be stronger and more agile and won the fight. This caused her to be fired, so she started performing elsewhere.

A star
The Kit Kat club was another famous venue in Cairo, and this is where Akef was introduced to film director Abbas Kemal.  His brother Hussein Fawzy, also a film director, was very interested in having Akef star in one of his musical films. The first of such films was “Al-Eïch wal malh” (bread and salt). Her costar was singer Saad Abdel Wahab, the nephew of the legendary singer and composer Mohammed Abdel Wahab. The film premiered on the 17th of January 1949, and was an instant success, bringing recognition also to Nahhas Film studios.

Retirement and death
Akef quit acting in 1964 to take care of her only child, a son from her second marriage to accountant Salaheldeen Abdel Aleem. She died two years later from cancer, on April 23, 1966, at the age of 36.

Filmography 
 Aish Wal Malh (1949).*****
 Lahalibo (1949).*****
 Baladi Wa Khafa (1949).****
 Furigat (1950).****
 Baba Areess (1950).****
 Fataat Al Sirk (1951).*****
 Al Namr (1952).
 Ya Halawaat Al Hubb (1952).****
 A Million Pounds (1953)
 Arbah Banat Wa Zabit (1954).*****
 Aziza (1955).****
 Tamr Henna (1957).  with Ahmed Ramzy, Fayza Ahmed and Rushdy Abaza.*****
 Amir El Dahaa (1964).****

References

External links

Many video clips for the Legend Naima Akef
Library of video clips of Naima Akef

1929 births
1966 deaths
Egyptian film actresses
Egyptian comedians
Egyptian female dancers
Belly dancers
People from Tanta
20th-century Egyptian actresses
20th-century comedians
Deaths from cancer in Egypt